Mean Mark Eitzel Gets Fat is the first solo album by the singer/songwriter Mark Eitzel. It was self-released on cassette just before he formed American Music Club. Most of these songs formed the repertoire of the first American Music Club live shows. "Hold On To Your Lov " appeared on the band's first album, The Restless Stranger, in 1985. All songs were written by Eitzel.

Track listing
 "Swinglow" 	
 "You Can Be Beautiful"	
 "Hold On to Your Love"	
 "I Speak French" 	
 "A Tall Black Lady" 	
 "Keep This Dance for Me" 	
 "Shadow of My Name"

References
Martin C. Strong, The Great Rock Discography, seventh edition, Canongate US (October 2004), 

1982 debut albums
Mark Eitzel albums
Self-released albums